The Renju International Federation (RIF) is an international organization which was founded in Stockholm, Sweden on August 8, 1988. The main purpose of the federation is to unite all the Renju and gomoku national federations all over the world, organize international tournaments such as World Championships, together with other activities in renju and gomoku, and spread renju activities in the world. The federation carry out the General Assembly every two years.

The Central Committee 
The Central Committee is responsible to the current status of the Renju International Federation, together with the activities of the officials of the Federation. According to the status, there are 6 positions in the Central Committee.

Members
The Renju International Federation was founded in 1988 by 3 founder members: Japan, Soviet Union and Sweden. Up to 2017, there have been 20 members in the Renju International Federation. The list of members follows.

See also
 Renju
 Gomoku
 World Championships in Renju
 RIF rating list

References

Renju
renju
renju
renju